John McEnroe and Patrick McEnroe were the defending champions.  John McEnroe did not participate this year.  Patrick McEnroe partnered Richey Reneberg, losing in the second round.

Byron Black and Jonathan Stark won in the final 4–6, 7–5, 6–2, against Tom Nijssen and Cyril Suk.

Seeds
All seeds receive a bye into the second round.

Draw

Finals

Top half

Bottom half

Qualifying

Qualifying seeds

Qualifiers
  Mark Keil /  Libor Pimek

Qualifying draw

External links
 1993 Paris Open Doubles draw

Doubles